This is an list of People that have or had ships or ship classes named after them or the name is associated with the person with the ships being in service or previously in service with the Royal Navy, the United Kingdom's naval warfare force, or with predecessor fleets formally in the service of the Kingdom of England or the Commonwealth of England The list also includes fictional vessels which have prominently featured in literature about the Royal Navy.

Ship Classes 
Some people have had Royal ship classes named after them, the following are a list of people who had such classes named after them.

Royalty and Nobility

Monarchs

Queen Elizabeth I 
The following ship class was named after HMS Queen Elizabeth the first aircraft carrier commissioned in the class which was named after the dreadnought battleship HMS Queen Elizabeth in service from 1914 to 1948 which itself was named after the Tudor monarch Queen Elizabeth I.

Ships

Royalty and Nobility 
The following are British monarchs who have had Royal navy ships named after them.

Monarchs

Queen Elizabeth II 
There are no ships named after Queen Elizabeth II.

King Charles III 
The following are ships named after King Charles III the former Prince of Wales and Duke of Cornwall and Edinburgh.

Dukes

Dukes of Northumberland and the Percy Family 
The following are ships named after Dukes of Northumberland as well as the Percy Family, also known of the House of Percy.

Duke of Northumberland 
The following are named after the title of Duke of Northumberland rather than any holder of that title.

Sir Henry Percy (Hotspur) 
The following are ships named Hotspur the nicknamed for the 14th century noblemen Sir Henry Percy.

Other Dukes 
The following are Dukes with ships named after them

.

Dukedom Title 
The following are named after various Dukedom titles rather than any holder of those titles.

Military Officials

Mythological/Semi-Mythological

Explorers

Fictional RN ship names

Deities 
The following fictional ships are named after deities.

Other

References 

Ships, Royal Navy
Ships named after people